Tim Moreland is a radio sportscaster who is the voice of the Nebraska Cornhuskers.

Announcing career
Moreland calls football and basketball games for the University of Nebraska and called East Carolina Pirates football games for eleven seasons and is the former voice of the Minnesota Vikings (1983–84) and Minnesota Twins (1983). In addition, he called Catawba College Indians football and basketball, Cincinnati Bearcats football and basketball games, select high school football and basketball games.

Personal
Moreland graduated from the Benedictine College with a bachelor's and then master's degree from the University of Wisconsin-Superior, and got his doctorate degree at the University of Southern Mississippi. Moreland was born in Fort Dodge, Iowa and grew up in Sioux City. He is the father of two children, Mike and Katie, who are both lawyers. Tim is a communication professor at Catawba College in addition to sports announcing. He has been their faculty since 1994.

References

http://www.spoke.com/info/pF2zuNa/DrMoreland
http://csnbbs.com/showthread.php?tid=84388
http://www.huskers.com/ViewArticle.dbml?DB_OEM_ID=100&ATCLID=1246546

American radio sports announcers
Living people
People from Fort Dodge, Iowa
People from Sioux City, Iowa
Benedictine College alumni
University of Wisconsin–Superior alumni
University of Southern Mississippi alumni
Minnesota Vikings announcers
Minnesota Twins announcers
High school football announcers in the United States
College football announcers
National Football League announcers
Nebraska Cornhuskers football announcers
Major League Baseball broadcasters
College basketball announcers in the United States
High school basketball announcers in the United States
Year of birth missing (living people)